The 2006–07 Boston Bruins season, the franchise's 83rd, saw the team working toward improving on a 2005–06 season which saw them finish with the third-worst record in the Eastern Conference.

Offseason
Forward Marc Savard and defenceman Zdeno Chara were major additions to the team via free agency, while goaltender Tim Thomas took over the starting job after Andrew Raycroft was traded to the Toronto Maple Leafs in the off-season.

Regular season
Phil Kessel, the team's first-round pick in the 2006 NHL Entry Draft, immediately entered the lineup. However, he was lost from the roster in mid-December when he was diagnosed with a form of testicular cancer.  Kessel's cancer proved to be operable and was removed, and he returned to the Bruins' lineup on January 9, less than a month after his diagnosis.

The Bruins finished the regular season having allowed the most shorthanded goals in the NHL, with 18.

Season standings

Schedule and results

Player stats

Regular season
Scoring

Goaltending

Transactions

Trades

Free agents acquired

Free agents lost

Claimed off waivers

Draft picks
Boston's picks at the 2006 NHL Entry Draft in Vancouver, British Columbia.  The Bruins had the 5th overall draft pick.

External links
Official website of the Boston Bruins

See also
2006–07 NHL Season

References

Game log: Boston Bruins game log on espn.com
Team standings: NHL standings on espn.com
Season Stats:  on espn.com

Boston Bruins
Boston Bruins
Boston Bruins seasons
Boston Bruins
Boston Bruins
Bruins
Bruins